Ivan Novačić (born September 3, 1985) is a Croatian professional basketball player who last played for Dinamo Zagreb of the Croatian League.

Career 
Novačić debuted with the Croatian basketball club Dubrava in 2003. In 2005, he moved to Croatian basketball team Dubrovnik, then to Cedevita and one season he spent in Zrinjevac. He played three seasons in the Zagreb.

On August 24, 2014, he signed for HKK Široki

On February 11, 2016, he left HKK Široki and signed with Italian Serie A2 team Latina Basket

In 2016, he signed for Jolly JBS.

On July 1, 2017, Novačić signed with Cibona. When his contract expired in the Summer of 2021, he became a free agent. On December 31, 2021, Novačić was resigned at Cibona.

References

External links 
 ABA League Profile
 RealGM Profile
 Eurobasket.com Profile

Living people
1985 births
Croatian men's basketball players
KK Cibona players
Basketball players from Zadar
HKK Široki players
KK Cedevita players
KK Zagreb players
KK Zrinjevac players
Forwards (basketball)